Gummies Bush is a farming locality in Southland, New Zealand,  west of the Aparima River,  north of Riverton, and  south from Otautau. It is said to be named after whaler and later pig-farmer James Leader, nicknamed "Gummie" because he had no teeth. Leader had a camp in the bush in this location. To Māori, the area was known as Opuaki. It was apparently named after a person, Puaki, a word which means "to come forth in position," or "to come forth in language – that is to utter.

References

Populated places in Southland, New Zealand